The Chafarinas Islands (or ,  or ), also spelled Zafarin, Djaferin or Zafarani, are a group of three small Spanish islets located in the Alboran Sea off the coast of Morocco with an aggregate area of ,  to the east of Nador and  off the Moroccan town of Ras Kebdana.

History
They were uninhabited and unclaimed in 1848, when the French government decided to occupy them, in order to monitor the tribes living in the border area between Morocco and French Algeria. A small expedition under the command of Colonel MacMahon (the future Marshal MacMahon) left Oran by sea and by land in January 1848 to take possession of the islands. Forewarned by its consul in Oran, Spain, which also coveted the Chafarinas, quickly dispatched a warship to the islands from Malaga. When the French arrived, the Spaniards had already taken possession of the islands in the name of Queen Isabel II.

Geography
The Chafarinas Islands are made up of three islands (from west to east, with areas in hectares):

 Isla del Congreso (25.6 ha)
 Isla de Isabel II (15.3 ha) (with garrison)
 Isla del Rey (11.6 ha).

Under Spanish control since 1847, there is a 30-man military garrison on Isla Isabel II, the only stable population on the small archipelago, down from 426 people in 1900 and 736 people in 1910. Small numbers of scientists, anti-trafficking police, and other authorized personnel sometimes increase the population to around 50.

Natural history
The islands had relevance in Spanish environmentalist circles during the 1980s and 1990s, as the last individual of Mediterranean monk seal in Spanish territory lived there until it disappeared in the 1990s. Nine out of eleven of its marine invertebrates are considered endangered species and it is the home of the second largest colony of endangered Audouin's gull in the world. The islands have been recognised as an Important Bird Area (IBA) by BirdLife International because they support, as well as the Audouin's gull colony, a breeding colony of Scopoli's shearwaters, with some 800–1,000 breeding pairs estimated in 2001–2004.

Gallery

See also 
 Plazas de soberanía
 List of islands of Spain
 List of Spanish Colonial Wars in Morocco
 Spanish Protectorate of Morocco

References

 
Islands of Africa
Archipelagoes of Spain
Mediterranean islands
Plazas de soberanía
Territorial disputes of Spain
Archipelagoes of Africa
Natura 2000 in Spain
Important Bird Areas of Spain
Important Bird Areas of Mediterranean islands
Seabird colonies